The Magnolia Hotel, formerly the Sheraton Omaha, was originally constructed as the Aquila Court Building, and is located at 1615 Howard Street in downtown Omaha, Nebraska. Built in 1923, it was listed on the National Register of Historic Places in 1974.

About
Designed by architectural firm Holabird and Roach for capitalists Chester and Raymond Cook of Chicago, the Aquila Court Building was built in a "U" shape and designed after the Bargello in Italy. The faces of George and Aquila Cook were emblazoned on the front of the building.  A mixed-use building from its inception, the building's interior courtyard featured extensive landscape gardening. The original garden design resembled an Italian formal garden with stone paths, pools with goldfish, canals and numerous plants. A four-story building, the original design included court-level commercial space and studio apartments, as well as office space.

The building has undergone several major renovations. In 1972 the gardens were removed and completely covered with marble slabs and fountains. In 1996 the building was renovated by the Sheraton corporation and in 2006 by the Magnolia Hotels chain.

See also
 Landmarks in Omaha

References

External links

 Magnolia Hotels

Residential buildings completed in 1923
Omaha Landmarks
National Register of Historic Places in Omaha, Nebraska
History of Downtown Omaha, Nebraska
Hotels in Omaha, Nebraska
Residential buildings on the National Register of Historic Places in Nebraska
Commercial buildings on the National Register of Historic Places in Nebraska
Hotel buildings completed in 1923
Hotels established in 1923